This is a list of the mammal species recorded in Mauritania. Of the mammal species in Mauritania, three are critically endangered, nine are vulnerable, and one is near threatened. One of the species listed for Mauritania can no longer be found in the wild.

The following tags are used to highlight each species' conservation status as assessed by the International Union for Conservation of Nature:

Some species were assessed using an earlier set of criteria. Species assessed using this system have the following instead of near threatened and least concern categories:

Order: Hyracoidea (hyraxes) 

The hyraxes are any of four species of fairly small, thickset, herbivorous mammals in the order Hyracoidea. About the size of a domestic cat they are well-furred, with rounded bodies and a stumpy tail. They are native to Africa and the Middle East.

Family: Procaviidae (hyraxes)
Genus: Procavia
 Cape hyrax, Procavia capensis LC

Order: Proboscidea (elephants) 

The elephants comprise three living species and are the largest living land animals.
Family: Elephantidae (elephants)
Genus: Loxodonta
African bush elephant, L. africana  extirpated

Order: Sirenia (manatees and dugongs) 

Sirenia is an order of fully aquatic, herbivorous mammals that inhabit rivers, estuaries, coastal marine waters, swamps, and marine wetlands. All four species are endangered.

Family: Trichechidae
Genus: Trichechus
 African manatee, Trichechus senegalensis VU

Order: Primates 

The order Primates contains humans and their closest relatives: lemurs, lorisoids, tarsiers, monkeys, and apes.
Suborder: Haplorhini
Infraorder: Simiiformes
Parvorder: Catarrhini
Superfamily: Cercopithecoidea
Family: Cercopithecidae (Old World monkeys)
Genus: Erythrocebus
 Patas monkey, Erythrocebus patas
Genus: Chlorocebus
 Green monkey, Chlorocebus sabaeus
Genus: Papio
 Olive baboon, Papio anubis
 Guinea baboon, Papio papio

Order: Rodentia (rodents) 
Rodents make up the largest order of mammals, with over 40% of mammalian species. They have two incisors in the upper and lower jaw which grow continually and must be kept short by gnawing.

Suborder: Hystricognathi
Family: Hystricidae (Old World porcupines)
Genus: Hystrix
 Crested porcupine, Hystrix cristata LC
Suborder: Sciurognathi
Family: Sciuridae (squirrels)
Subfamily: Xerinae
Tribe: Xerini
Genus: Xerus
 Striped ground squirrel, Xerus erythropus LC
Family: Dipodidae (jerboas)
Subfamily: Dipodinae
Genus: Jaculus
 Lesser Egyptian jerboa, Jaculus jaculus LC
Family: Nesomyidae
Subfamily: Cricetomyinae
Genus: Cricetomys
 Gambian pouched rat, Cricetomys gambianus LC
Family: Muridae (mice, rats, voles, gerbils, hamsters, etc.)
Subfamily: Deomyinae
Genus: Acomys
 Western Saharan spiny mouse, Acomys airensis LC
 Chudeau's spiny mouse, Acomys chudeaui LC
Subfamily: Gerbillinae
Genus: Desmodilliscus
 Pouched gerbil, Desmodilliscus braueri LC
Genus: Dipodillus
 North African gerbil, Dipodillus campestris LC
Genus: Gerbillus
 Lesser Egyptian gerbil, Gerbillus gerbillus LC
 Mauritania gerbil, Gerbillus mauritaniae DD
 Balochistan gerbil, Gerbillus nanus LC
 Nigerian gerbil, Gerbillus nigeriae LC
 Greater Egyptian gerbil, Gerbillus pyramidum LC
 Tarabul's gerbil, Gerbillus tarabuli LC
Genus: Meriones
 Libyan jird, Meriones libycus LC
Genus: Psammomys
 Fat sand rat, Psammomys obesus LC
Genus: Taterillus
 Robbins's tateril, Taterillus arenarius LC
 Senegal gerbil, Taterillus pygargus LC
 Tranieri's tateril, Taterillus tranieri DD
Subfamily: Murinae
Genus: Arvicanthis
 African grass rat, Arvicanthis niloticus LC
Genus: Mastomys
 Guinea multimammate mouse, Mastomys erythroleucus LC
 Hubert's multimammate mouse, Mastomys huberti LC
 Natal multimammate mouse, Mastomys natalensis LC
Genus: Mus
 Hausa mouse, Mus haussa LC
Family: Ctenodactylidae
Genus: Felovia
 Felou gundi, Felovia vae DD

Order: Lagomorpha (lagomorphs) 
The lagomorphs comprise two families, Leporidae (hares and rabbits), and Ochotonidae (pikas). Though they can resemble rodents, and were classified as a superfamily in that order until the early 20th century, they have since been considered a separate order. They differ from rodents in a number of physical characteristics, such as having four incisors in the upper jaw rather than two.
Family: Leporidae (rabbits, hares)
Genus: Lepus
Cape hare, L. capensis 
African savanna hare, L. microtis

Order: Erinaceomorpha (hedgehogs and gymnures) 
The order Erinaceomorpha contains a single family, Erinaceidae, which comprise the hedgehogs and gymnures. The hedgehogs are easily recognised by their spines while gymnures look more like large rats.
Family: Erinaceidae (hedgehogs)
Subfamily: Erinaceinae
Genus: Atelerix
 Four-toed hedgehog, Atelerix albiventris
Genus: Hemiechinus
 Desert hedgehog, Hemiechinus aethiopicus

Order: Soricomorpha (shrews, moles, and solenodons) 
The "shrew-forms" are insectivorous mammals. The shrews and solenodons closely resemble mice while the moles are stout-bodied burrowers.

Family: Soricidae (shrews)
Subfamily: Crocidurinae
Genus: Crocidura
 Cinderella shrew, Crocidura cinderella LC
 Savanna shrew, Crocidura fulvastra LC
 Bicolored musk shrew, Crocidura fuscomurina LC
 Mauritanian shrew, Crocidura lusitania LC
 Savanna dwarf shrew, Crocidura nanilla LC
 Saharan shrew, Crocidura tarfayensis DD
 Savanna path shrew, Crocidura viaria LC

Order: Chiroptera (bats) 
The bats' most distinguishing feature is that their forelimbs are developed as wings, making them the only mammals capable of flight. Bat species account for about 20% of all mammals.

Family: Pteropodidae (flying foxes, Old World fruit bats)
Subfamily: Pteropodinae
Genus: Eidolon
 Straw-coloured fruit bat, Eidolon helvum LC
Family: Vespertilionidae
Subfamily: Vespertilioninae
Genus: Nycticeinops
 Schlieffen's bat, Nycticeinops schlieffeni LC
Genus: Scotophilus
 White-bellied yellow bat, Scotophilus leucogaster LC
Family: Rhinopomatidae
Genus: Rhinopoma
 Egyptian mouse-tailed bat, R. cystops 
 Lesser mouse-tailed bat, Rhinopoma hardwickei LC
 Greater mouse-tailed bat, Rhinopoma microphyllum LC
Family: Emballonuridae
Genus: Taphozous
 Naked-rumped tomb bat, Taphozous nudiventris LC
 Egyptian tomb bat, Taphozous perforatus LC
Family: Nycteridae
Genus: Nycteris
 Gambian slit-faced bat, Nycteris gambiensis LC
 Hairy slit-faced bat, Nycteris hispida LC
 Egyptian slit-faced bat, Nycteris thebaica LC
Family: Rhinolophidae
Subfamily: Rhinolophinae
Genus: Rhinolophus
 Rüppell's horseshoe bat, Rhinolophus fumigatus LC
Subfamily: Hipposiderinae
Genus: Asellia
 Trident leaf-nosed bat, Asellia tridens LC

Order: Pholidota (pangolins) 
The order Pholidota comprises the eight species of pangolin. Pangolins are anteaters and have the powerful claws, elongated snout and long tongue seen in the other unrelated anteater species.
Family: Manidae
Genus: Manis
Giant pangolin, M. gigantea

Order: Cetacea (whales) 

The order Cetacea includes whales, dolphins and porpoises. They are the mammals most fully adapted to aquatic life with a spindle-shaped nearly hairless body, protected by a thick layer of blubber, and forelimbs and tail modified to provide propulsion underwater.

Suborder: Mysticeti
Family: Balaenidae (right whales)
Genus: Eubalaena
 North Atlantic right whale CR (Seen historically)
Family: Balaenopteridae
Subfamily: Balaenopterinae
Genus: Balaenoptera
 Common minke whale, Balaenoptera acutorostrata VU
 Omura's whale, Balaenoptera omurai DD (the first case found in Atlantic oceans)
 Bryde's whale, Balaenoptera brydei EN
 Sei whale, Balaenoptera borealis EN
 Fin whale, Balaenoptera physalus EN
 Blue whale, Balaenoptera musculus EN
Subfamily: Megapterinae
Genus: Megaptera
 Humpback whale, Megaptera novaeangliae VU
Suborder: Odontoceti
Superfamily: Platanistoidea
Family: Phocoenidae
Genus: Phocoena
 Harbour porpoise, Phocoena phocoena VU
Family: Physeteridae
Genus: Physeter
 Sperm whale, Physeter macrocephalus VU
Family: Kogiidae
Genus: Kogia
 Pygmy sperm whale, Kogia breviceps DD
 Dwarf sperm whale, Kogia sima DD
Family: Ziphidae
Genus: Mesoplodon
 Blainville's beaked whale, Mesoplodon densirostris DD
 Gervais' beaked whale, Mesoplodon europaeus DD
Genus: Ziphius
 Cuvier's beaked whale, Ziphius cavirostris DD
Family: Delphinidae (marine dolphins)
Genus: Orcinus
 Killer whale, Orcinus orca DD
Genus: Feresa
 Pygmy killer whale, Feresa attenuata DD
Genus: Pseudorca
 False killer whale, Pseudorca crassidens DD
Genus: Delphinus
 Short-beaked common dolphin, Delphinus delphis LR/cd
Genus: Lagenodelphis
 Fraser's dolphin, Lagenodelphis hosei DD
Genus: Stenella
 Pantropical spotted dolphin, Stenella attenuata LR/cd
 Clymene dolphin, Stenella clymene DD
 Striped dolphin, Stenella coeruleoalba DD
 Atlantic spotted dolphin, Stenella frontalis DD
 Spinner dolphin, Stenella longirostris LR/cd
Genus: Steno
 Rough-toothed dolphin, Steno bredanensis DD
Genus: Tursiops
 Common bottlenose dolphin, Tursiops truncatus LC
Genus: Globicephala
 Short-finned pilot whale, Globicephala macrorhynchus DD
Genus: Grampus
 Risso's dolphin, Grampus griseus DD
Genus: Peponocephala
 Melon-headed whale, Peponocephala electra DD

Order: Carnivora (carnivorans) 

There are over 260 species of carnivorans, the majority of which eat meat as their primary dietary item. They have a characteristic skull shape and dentition.
Suborder: Feliformia
Family: Felidae (cats)
Subfamily: Felinae
Genus: Acinonyx
 Cheetah, Acinonyx jubatus VU
Genus: Caracal
 Caracal, Caracal caracal LC
Genus: Felis
African wildcat, F. lybica 
Sand cat, F. margarita NT
Subfamily: Pantherinae
Genus: Panthera
 Lion, P. leo  extirpated
 Leopard, P. pardus  extirpated
Family: Viverridae
Subfamily: Viverrinae
Genus: Genetta
 Common genet, Genetta genetta LC
Family: Herpestidae (mongooses)
Genus: Herpestes
 Common slender mongoose, Herpestes sanguineus LC
Family: Hyaenidae (hyaenas)
Genus: Crocuta
 Spotted hyena, Crocuta crocuta LC
Genus: Hyaena
 Striped hyena, Hyaena hyaena NT
Suborder: Caniformia
Family: Canidae (dogs, foxes)
Genus: Vulpes
 Pale fox, Vulpes pallida LC
 Rüppell's fox, Vulpes rueppelli LC
 Fennec, Vulpes zerda LC
Genus: Canis
 African golden wolf, Canis lupaster LC
Genus: Lupulella
 Side-striped jackal, L. adusta  
Genus: Lycaon
 African wild dog, L. pictus  extirpated
Family: Mustelidae (mustelids)
Genus: Ictonyx
Saharan striped polecat, Ictonyx libyca 
 Striped polecat, Ictonyx striatus LC
Genus: Mellivora
 Honey badger, Mellivora capensis LC
Suborder: Pinnipedia
Family: Phocidae (earless seals)
Genus: Monachus
 Mediterranean monk seal, Monachus monachus EN

Order: Artiodactyla (even-toed ungulates) 

The even-toed ungulates are ungulates whose weight is borne about equally by the third and fourth toes, rather than mostly or entirely by the third as in perissodactyls. There are about 220 artiodactyl species, including many that are of great economic importance to humans.

Family: Suidae (pigs)
Subfamily: Phacochoerinae
Genus: Phacochoerus
 Common warthog, Phacochoerus africanus LR/lc
Family: Hippopotamidae (hippopotamuses)
Genus: Hippopotamus
 Hippopotamus, Hippopotamus amphibius  extirpated
Family: Giraffidae (giraffe, okapi)
Genus: Giraffa
 Giraffe, Giraffa camelopardalis VU extirpated
Family: Bovidae (cattle, antelope, sheep, goats)
Subfamily: Alcelaphinae
Genus: Damaliscus
 Topi, Damaliscus lunatus LR/cd
Subfamily: Antilopinae
Genus: Gazella
 Dorcas gazelle, Gazella dorcas VU
 Red-fronted gazelle, Gazella rufifrons VU
Genus: Nanger
 Dama gazelle, N. dama CR extirpated
Subfamily: Bovinae
Genus: Tragelaphus
 Bushbuck, Tragelaphus scriptus LR/lc
Subfamily: Caprinae
Genus: Ammotragus
 Barbary sheep, Ammotragus lervia VU
Subfamily: Hippotraginae
Genus: Addax
 Addax, Addax nasomaculatus CR possibly extirpated
Genus: Hippotragus
 Roan antelope, Hippotragus equinus LR/cd
Genus: Oryx
 Scimitar oryx, Oryx dammah EW extirpated
Subfamily: Reduncinae
Genus: Kobus
 Kob, Kobus kob LR/cd
Genus: Redunca
 Bohor reedbuck, Redunca redunca LR/cd

Notes

References

See also
List of chordate orders
Lists of mammals by region
List of prehistoric mammals
Mammal classification
List of mammals described in the 2000s
Banc d'Arguin National Park
Wildlife of Mauritania

Mauritania
Mauritania

Mammals